Marjo Anneli Arho (born 12 April 1951) is a Finnish music educator, writer and composer.

Life
Anneli Arho was born in Helsinki and studied theory and composition at the Sibelius Academy with Jukka Tiensuu. She continued study at Freiburg with Klaus Huber and Brian Ferneyhough, graduating as a Doctor of Music. She took a position as a teacher at the Department of Composition and Music Theory, Sibelius Academy, and writes professional articles for magazines including Philosophy of Music Education Review. She is married to Jukka Tiensuu.

Works
Selected works include:

Minos (1978) for harpsichord, dedicated to Jukka Tiensuu
Once upon a time (1980) woodwind quintet
Aikaika (Les temps emboites) (1987) for three cellos
Answer for mezzo-soprano, horn and string quartet (1978)
Par comparaison for three cellos (1981)
Atmosphere (1997)
In sordina (2006)

Arho's compositions have been recorded and issued on CD, including:
The Exuberant Harpsichord – Jukka Tiensuu, harpsichord – Works of György Ligeti, Thomas Morley, Jean-Philippe Rameau, Erik Bergman, Anneli Arho, Esa-Pekka Salonen, Usko Merilainen, Francois-Bernard Mache, Finlandia.

References

1951 births
Living people
20th-century classical composers
Women classical composers
Finnish classical composers
Finnish music educators
Women music educators
Finnish women classical composers
20th-century women composers
20th-century Finnish composers